Yale Airport  is a public-use airport located one nautical mile (1.85 km) southeast of the central business district of Yale, a city in St. Clair County, Michigan, United States.

Facilities and aircraft 
It has one runway designated 9/27 with a turf surface measuring 2,300 by 110 feet (701 x 34 m). For the 12-month period ending December 31, 2009, the airport had 200 general aviation aircraft operations, an average of 16 per month.

References

External links 
 Yale (D20) airport diagram from Michigan DOT
 Aerial image as of 28 March 1999 from USGS The National Map

Airports in Michigan
Buildings and structures in St. Clair County, Michigan
Transportation in St. Clair County, Michigan